Orléans East-Cumberland Ward (Ward 1) is a city ward in the city of Ottawa, Ontario, Canada, represented on Ottawa City Council. It was created before the 2000 Election when the area was amalgamated into the city of Ottawa. The ward covers much of the suburban community of Orleans in the east of the city. Previous to that, the ward existed in the Regional Municipality of Ottawa-Carleton Council. It contains the neighbourhoods of Queenswood Heights, Queenswood Village, Fallingbrook, Cardinal Creek, Cardinal Creek Village, Bella Vista and Cumberland Village.

History

From 2006 to 2022, it was known as Orléans Ward, and contained the neighbourhoods of Convent Glen, Convent Glen South, Hiawatha Park, Orleans Wood, Riverglen, Queenswood Village, Chatelaine Village, River Walk, Queenswood Heights, Queenswood South, Fallingbrook and the eastern part of the Cardinal Creek neighbourhood (east of Trim Road). Not all of Orleans was in the ward, as some of it is in Cumberland Ward and Innes Ward. When the Ward boundaries changed for the 2006 election, there was only a small change to the ward boundary on Portobello.

The ward was represented by Bob Monette from 2006 to 2018. He was elected in a by-election when the ward was vacated by Herb Kreling in September 2005. Kreling had held the seat since its inception. Montette won the by-election in January 2006. Monette retired in 2018, and the ward has been represented by Matthew Luloff ever since.

Following the 2020 Ottawa Ward boundary review, the ward's southern boundary became Innes Road, and the ward expanded eastward to include Cumberland Village, and lost the Convent Glen neighbourhood, as its western border shifted to Champlain Street north of Highway 174 and Bilberry Creek south of Highway 174.

Demographics
According to the Canada 2011 Census

The Ward's population was 47,670.

Ethnic groups: 81.4% White, 5.5% Black, 3.0% South Asian, 2.8% Aboriginal, 1.9% Arab, 1.7% Chinese 
Languages: 59.6% English, 31.7% French, 1.5% Arabic, 1.0% Chinese 
Religions: 78.2% Christian (53.7% Catholic, 6.7% United Church, 5.8% Anglican, 1.5% Presbyterian, 1.3% Pentecostal, 1.1% Baptist, 8.1% Other), 3.1% Muslim, 1.1% Hindu, 16.5% No religion 
Median income (2010): $45,285 
Average income (2010): $50,954

Regional and City Councillors
Prior to 1994, the area was represented by the Mayors of Cumberland and Gloucester and 2 at large Gloucester city and regional councillors. From 1994 to 2000, the area was covered by Queenswood and Fallingbrook Wards on Cumberland City Council and Orléans North Ward on Gloucester City Council.

Herb Kreling (1994–2006)
Bob Monette (2006–2018)
Matthew Luloff (2018–present)

Election results

1994 Ottawa-Carleton Regional Municipality elections

1997 Ottawa-Carleton Regional Municipality elections

2000 Ottawa municipal election
Following amalgamation, regional councillor Herb Kreling defeated Cumberland City Councillors John Morgan (Queenswood Ward) and Gerry Lalonde (Heritage Ward).

2003 Ottawa municipal election

2006 by-election

Held on January 9 to replace the out going Herb Kreling.

Candidates 

Elena Harder:  Daughter of Bell-South Nepean Ward councillor Jan Harder
Debbie Jodoin: Socially Conservative political activist
Sheryl MacDonald: Orleans/Cumberland Public School Board Trustee 1997-2005, as well as former Human Rights Commissioner, provincial Labour Relations Board Member, United Way Director, Family Services Association Board Member, Citizen Advocacy Board Member, and Human Resources manager for Air Canada (28 years).
Pierre Maheu  president of the Orléans Parks and Recreation Association and a member of the City of Ottawa's Committee of Adjustment, ran for regional council in 1997 (Innes Ward), and in 2002 dropped out of the race for the Liberal Party of Ontario nomination in Ottawa—Orléans.
Louise Malloy: Seniors advocate and a retired military sergeant. Ran in the 2003 election, and lost to Herb Kreling.
Bob Monette: Former Cumberland Township councillor (1985–1991). Ran for regional council in 1994 but lost.
Gino L. Nicolini Owner of Nicolini Construction and Engineering Ltd. as well as several pizza shops in and around Ottawa namely Nicolini PizzaLand.
Michel Tardif Fringe candidate

Dropped out
Don Rivington - ran in Bay Ward in the 2003 election. Opted to run in mayoral race instead, to forward is one issue candidacy (that Ottawa should get an ombudsman)

Results

2006 Ottawa municipal election
After facing seven candidates in the January by-election, incumbent councillor Bob Monette, faced off against Dennis Vowles, son of former Gloucester city councillor Ken Vowles.

2010 Ottawa municipal election

2014 Ottawa municipal election

2018 Ottawa municipal election

In 2018, Orleans Ward had 17 candidate names on the ballot, a record. Two candidates, Doug Feltmate and Louise Soyez, withdrew late in the campaign, reducing the active names to 15.

2022 Ottawa municipal election

References

External links
 Map of Orléans Ward

Ottawa wards